Peppermill Wendover is a hotel and casino located in West Wendover, Nevada. This casino as well as Rainbow and the Montego Bay are owned and operated by Peppermill Casinos, Inc.

History
The casino at this location was formerly known as the Hideaway Casino from 1976 to 1980 and the Gold Rush Casino from 1981 to 1984 and then in 1985 it was purchased by Peppermill Casinos, remodeled and reopened in July 1985.

See also

 Peppermill Casinos

References

Casino hotels
Casinos completed in 1985
Casinos in West Wendover, Nevada
Hotel buildings completed in 1985
1985 establishments in Nevada